Edilemma is a monotypic genus of Brazilian jumping spiders containing the single species, Edilemma foraminifera. It was first described by G. R. S. Ruiz & Antônio Domingos Brescovit in 2006, and is only found in Brazil.

References

Further reading

Monotypic Salticidae genera
Salticidae
Spiders of Brazil